The Quad City Botanical Center is a set of botanical gardens located next to the Mississippi River at 2525 4th Avenue, Rock Island, Illinois. It is open daily except major holidays; an admission fee is charged.

The center opened on June 20, 1998. Its gardens include:

 Sun Garden conservatory (6,444 square feet) - includes sweet acacia, allspice, arrowhead, bamboo, banana, bird of paradise, bromeliads, cacao, cardamom, cassava,  coconut, coffee, ferns, frangipani, Arabian jasmine, lychee, orchids,  palms, papaya, papyrus, pineapple, sapodilla, vanilla, and ylang-ylang, as well as a  waterfall, reflecting pools with koi, and a  skylight.
 Scott County Regional Authority Conifer Garden (established 2001) - over 40 conifers from the collection of Justin C. Harper, including cultivars such as Ginkgo biloba 'Todd's Broom', Taxus cuspidate 'Fastigiate Aurea', and Thuja standishii.
 Physically Challenged Garden (established July 2003) - planting beds at varying heights for gardeners with physical limitations.
 Scrambled Alphabet Garden - for children.

External links 
 Quad City Botanical Center

See also 
 List of botanical gardens in the United States

Botanical gardens in Illinois
Buildings and structures in Rock Island, Illinois
Culture of the Quad Cities
Tourist attractions in Rock Island, Illinois
Protected areas of Rock Island County, Illinois
Greenhouses in Illinois
1998 establishments in Illinois